Anthene bakeri is a butterfly in the family Lycaenidae first described by Hamilton Herbert Druce in 1910. It is found in the Democratic Republic of the Congo.

References

Butterflies described in 1910
Anthene
Endemic fauna of the Democratic Republic of the Congo
Butterflies of Africa